Campoona is a locality in the Australian state of South Australia located on Eyre Peninsula about   north-west of the state capital of Adelaide and about  north-west of the municipal seat in Cleve. The area is part of the territory of the Parnkalla Aboriginal Australians.

Campoona's name was officially adopted and its boundaries were both created on 23 December 1998.

The dominant industry is broadacre farming of grains and sheep. Archer Exploration Limited proposes to establish a graphite mine in the area in 2015.

Campoona is located within the federal division of Grey, the state electoral district of Flinders and the local government area of the District Council of Cleve.

References

Towns in South Australia
Eyre Peninsula